Joan Alexandra Molinsky (June 8, 1933 – September 4, 2014), known professionally as Joan Rivers, was an American comedian, actress, producer, writer and television host. She was noted for her blunt, often controversial comedic persona—heavily self-deprecating and acerbic, especially towards celebrities and politicians, delivered in her signature New York accent. She is considered a pioneer of women in comedy by many critics.

Rivers started her career in comedy clubs in Greenwich Village alongside her peers George Carlin, Woody Allen, and Richard Pryor. She then rose to prominence in 1965 as a guest on The Tonight Show. Hosted by her mentor, Johnny Carson, the show established Rivers's comedic style. In 1986, with her own rival program, The Late Show with Joan Rivers, Rivers became the first woman to host a late night network television talk show. She subsequently hosted The Joan Rivers Show (1989–1993), winning a Daytime Emmy for Outstanding Talk Show Host.  From the mid-1990s, she became known for her comedic red carpet awards show celebrity interviews. Rivers co-hosted the E! celebrity fashion show Fashion Police from 2010 to 2014 and starred in the reality series Joan & Melissa: Joan Knows Best? (2011–2014) with daughter Melissa Rivers.

In addition to marketing a line of jewelry and apparel on the QVC shopping channel, Rivers authored 12 best-selling books and three LP comedy albums under her own name: Mr. Phyllis and Other Funny Stories (Warner Bros 1965), The Next to Last Joan Rivers Album (Buddah 1969), and What Becomes a Semi-Legend Most? (Geffen 1983).  She was nominated in 1984 for a Grammy Award for her album What Becomes a Semi-Legend Most? and was nominated in 1994 for the Tony Award for Best Actress in a Play for her performance of the title role in Sally Marr ... and Her Escorts. In 2009, Rivers competed alongside her daughter Melissa on the second season of The Celebrity Apprentice, ultimately winning the season. In 2015, Rivers posthumously received a Grammy Award for Best Spoken Word Album for her book, Diary of a Mad Diva.

In 1968, The New York Times television critic Jack Gould called Rivers "quite possibly the most intuitively funny woman alive". In 2017, Rolling Stone magazine ranked her sixth on its list of the 50 best stand-up comics of all time, and in October the same year, she was inducted into the Television Academy Hall of Fame. She is the subject of the documentary Joan Rivers: A Piece of Work (2010).

Early life 
Joan Alexandra Molinsky was born on June 8, 1933, in Brooklyn, New York, to Russian-Jewish immigrants Beatrice (née Grushman) and Meyer C. Molinsky, a doctor. She had an elder sister named Barbara Waxler. Rivers spent her early life in Prospect Heights and Crown Heights in Brooklyn. She attended the progressive and now-defunct Brooklyn Ethical Culture School and Adelphi Academy of Brooklyn, a college preparatory day school, where she was co-chairman of her school, due to her past experiences in theatrical activities. Within two years, she performed in the School Cavalcades, and in 1949, aged 16, she was vice president of the Dramatic Club. She graduated from the Adelphi Academy of Brooklyn, in 1951, at 18. In her adolescence, Rivers relocated with her family to Larchmont, north of New York City. Rivers stated in interviews that she was overweight throughout her childhood and adolescence and that it had a profound impact on her body image, which she struggled with throughout her life.

She attended Connecticut College for two years before transferring to Barnard College where she graduated in 1954 with a BA in English literature and anthropology. She repeatedly said, and it was reported, that she graduated summa cum laude and as a member of Phi Beta Kappa; however, her biographer found these were fabrications, as with other statements such as sharing a lesbian kiss in a play with Barbra Streisand (they did both appear in a play named Driftwood, but were never on stage at the same time). Before entering show business, Rivers worked at various jobs such as a tour guide at Rockefeller Center, a writer/proofreader at an advertising agency and a fashion consultant at Bond Clothing Stores. During this period, agent Tony Rivers advised her to change her name, so she chose Joan Rivers as her stage name.

Career

1950s–1960s 

During the late 1950s, Rivers appeared in a short Off-Broadway run play, Driftwood, in which Barbra Streisand was also a cast member. It ran for six weeks on playwright Maurice Tei Dunn's apartment on 49th Street, in NYC, according to an interview with Adweek. Rivers performed in numerous comedy clubs in the Greenwich Village area of New York City in the early 1960s, including The Bitter End, The Gaslight Cafe and The Duplex. Rivers became friends with her fellow Greenwich Village comedians Woody Allen and George Carlin and often ate with them. She also describes working in the Village alongside noted musicians Bob Dylan, Barbra Streisand, Carly Simon and Simon and Garfunkel. Between 1963 and 1964, Rivers, along with Jim Connell and Jake Holmes, was in the cabaret act "Jim, Jake & Joan". A 1964 appearance at The Bitter End resulted in their appearance in the motion picture, Once Upon A Coffee House, which was also Rivers' first big screen credit. The group parted ways shortly afterwards, on which member Holmes later recalled: "We were supposed to do this rally for Bobby Kennedy, who was running for New York senator in 1964. We were going to play at the rally. Joan showed up with a [Republican Senate nominee Kenneth] Keating button on. And Jim said take that off. She said no — she was sticking to her political guns. And Jim said, "Who needs you, anyway?" That was the end [of Jim, Jake & Joan] ...".

She also made an appearance as a guest on the television program The Tonight Show originating from New York, hosted at the time by Jack Paar. By 1965, Rivers had a stint on Candid Camera as a gag writer and participant; she was "the bait" to lure people into ridiculous situations for the show. After seven auditions during a period of three years, she made her first appearance on The Tonight Show with new host Johnny Carson, on February 17, 1965. Rivers credited this episode to be her breakthrough, as Carson said to her on the air "you're gonna be a star". Following this appearance, she became a frequent guest on the program and a close friend of Carson.

As her profile rose significantly in the subsequent years, she started to make guest-appearances in numerous popular shows, including The Ed Sullivan Show, The Mike Douglas Show, The Dick Cavett Show and Girl Talk, with Virginia Graham. She also wrote material for the puppet mouse Topo Gigio. She had a brief role in the cult drama film The Swimmer (1968), starring Burt Lancaster, and at the time, she also had a short-lived syndicated daytime talk show, That Show with Joan Rivers, which premiered on September 16, 1968. Each episode had a theme and Rivers did an opening monologue based on the day's topic, followed by celebrity interviews. The show also featured an expert on the subject and a celebrity guest; Johnny Carson was her first guest. In the mid-1960s, she released at least two comedy albums: The Next to Last Joan Rivers Album and Rivers Presents Mr. Phyllis & Other Funny Stories.

1970s 
By the 1970s, Rivers continued to be a prominent fixture on television. Along with her other guest-spots on the late-night circuit, she also made appearances on The Carol Burnett Show, had a semi-regular stint on Hollywood Squares and guest-starred on Here's Lucy. Rivers made her Broadway debut in the play Fun City, which opened on January 2, 1972, and co-starred Gabriel Dell, Rose Marie and Paul Ford. It ran for only nine performances amid a negative critical reception. Though a New York Times reviewer criticized the production as "frenetic to the point of being frazzled," he praised Rivers as "a deft comedy writer" and "a very funny lady". From 1972 to 1976, she narrated The Adventures of Letterman, an animated segment for The Electric Company.

In 1973, Rivers co-wrote the made-for-television movie The Girl Most Likely To..., a black comedy starring Stockard Channing as an ugly girl who becomes beautiful after undergoing plastic surgery, and takes revenge on people who previously mistreated her. The film, based on Rivers' story, became a ratings success and has been considered a "cult classic". She also wrote a thrice-weekly column for The Chicago Tribune from 1973 to 1976, and published her first book, Having a Baby Can Be a Scream, in 1974; she described it as a "catalogue of gynaecological anxieties". In 1978, Rivers made her directorial debut with the comedy Rabbit Test, which she also wrote and which starred her friend Billy Crystal in his film debut as the world's first pregnant man. The film flopped at the box office and was panned by critics. Janet Maslin of The New York Times concluded: "Miss Rivers has turned to directing without paying much heed to whether a whole movie constructed from one-liners is worth even the sum of its parts." During the same decade, she was the opening act for singers Helen Reddy, Robert Goulet, Paul Anka, Mac Davis, and Sergio Franchi on the Las Vegas Strip.

1980s 
During the early and mid-1980s, Rivers found further success on stand-up and television, though the decade subsequently proved to be controversial for her. The year 1983, in particular, was very successful; she performed at Carnegie Hall in February, did the March stand-up special An Audience with Joan Rivers, hosted the April 9 episode of Saturday Night Live, and released the best-selling comedy album What Becomes a Semi-Legend Most?, which reached No. 22 on the U.S. Billboard 200 and was nominated for a Grammy Award for Best Comedy Album. By August 1983, Carson established Rivers as his first permanent guest host on The Tonight Show. At the time, she spoke of her primary Tonight Show life as having been "Johnny Carson's daughter", a reference to his longtime mentoring of her.

During the 1980s and 1990s, Rivers served on the advisory board of the National Student Film Institute. A friend of Nancy Reagan, Rivers attended a state dinner in 1983, and later performed at a luncheon at the 1984 Republican National Convention. In 1984, Rivers published a best-selling humor book, The Life and Hard Times of Heidi Abramowitz, a mock memoir of her brassy, loose comedy character, which was mostly jokes about promiscuity – of a type that would have been considered unacceptable even in burlesque a generation earlier. A television special based on the character, a mock tribute called Joan Rivers and Friends Salute Heidi Abramowitz: Tramp of the Century, later aired on Showtime. She later wrote her next book, Enter Talking, which was released in 1986, and described her rise to stardom and the evolution of her comedic persona.

In 1986, the move came that ended Rivers' longtime friendship with Johnny Carson. The soon-to-launch Fox Television Network announced that it was giving her a late night talk show, The Late Show Starring Joan Rivers, making Rivers the first woman to have her own late-night talk show on a major network. The new network planned to broadcast the show 11 p.m. to midnight Eastern Time, making her a Carson competitor. Carson learned of the show from Fox and not from Rivers. In the documentary Johnny Carson: King of Late Night, Rivers said that she only called Carson to discuss the matter after learning that he may have already heard about it and that he immediately hung up on her. "And he never spoke to me again.  He took it as a complete betrayal," said Joan.   In the same interview, she said that she later came to believe that maybe she should have asked for his blessing before taking the job. Rivers was banned from ever appearing on The Tonight Show for the rest of Carson's tenure and the entire runs of Carson's first two successors Jay Leno and Conan O'Brien out of respect for Carson. Rivers did not appear on The Tonight Show again until February 17, 2014, when she made a brief appearance on new host Jimmy Fallon's first episode. On March 27, 2014, Rivers returned to the show for an interview.

The Late Show Starring Joan Rivers premiered on October 9, 1986, and soon turned out to be flecked with tragedy. When Rivers challenged Fox executives, who wanted to fire her husband Edgar Rosenberg as the show's producer, the network fired them both on May 15, 1987.

During this period, a published interview with Rivers, purported to have been written by “Ben Hacker”, suggested that Rosenberg had tried to drive Rivers insane during his final illness.  Rivers was quoted as saying “I think things are about finished with Edgar”, while calling her former Fox boss “Barry (expletive) Diller”.  Then, on August 14, 1987, Rosenberg committed suicide in Philadelphia; Rivers blamed the tragedy on his "humiliation" by Fox.  A lawsuit would later be filed against “Hacker” over the article. Rivers credited Nancy Reagan with helping her after her husband's suicide. Fox attempted to continue the show with a new name (The Late Show) and rotating guest hosts.

During the airing of her late-night show, she made the voice-over role of Dot Matrix in the science-fiction comedy Spaceballs (1987), a parody based (mainly) on Star Wars. The film, directed and co-starring Mel Brooks, was a critical and commercial success, later becoming a "cult classic". After the Fox controversy, her career went into hiatus. Rivers subsequently appeared on various television shows, including the Pee-wee's Playhouse Christmas Special in December 1989. She also appeared as one of the center square occupants on the 1986–89 version of The Hollywood Squares, hosted by John Davidson. On September 5, 1989, The Joan Rivers Show, her daytime television program, premiered in broadcast syndication. The show, which ran for five seasons, was a success and earned Rivers the Daytime Emmy in 1990 for Outstanding Talk Show Host. Entertainment Weekly, in a September 1990 article, asserted: "The Joan Rivers Show is a better showcase for her funny edginess than her doomed 1988 Fox nighttime program was. The best thing about her daytime talker is that Rivers' stream-of-consciousness chattiness is allowed to guide the show — you never know where the conversation is going to go".

1990s 
In addition to winning the Emmy for The Joan Rivers Show, Rivers starred in the made-for-television comedy How to Murder a Millionaire, which premiered in May 1990 on CBS. In the film, co-starring Alex Rocco and Telma Hopkins, she took on the role of a Beverly Hills matron possessed with the idea her husband is trying to kill her. Also in 1990, she started to design jewelry, clothing and beauty products for the shopping channel QVC. On this professional endeavor, Rivers said: "In those days, only dead celebrities went on [QVC]. My career was over. I had bills to pay. ... It also intrigued me at the beginning". The sales of Rivers' products exceeded $1 billion by 2014, making her one of the network's top sellers. In 1991, she wrote her next book, Still Talking, which described the cancellation of her late-night show and her husband's suicide. Until 1993, she received five additional Emmy nominations for her daytime talk-show The Joan Rivers Show — two for Outstanding Writing – Special Class and three for Outstanding Talk Show Host.

In 1994, Rivers and daughter Melissa first hosted the E! Entertainment Television pre-awards show for the Golden Globe Awards and, beginning in 1995, E!'s annual Academy Awards pre-awards show as well. Rivers and her daughter quickly became credited for revolutionizing the red carpet as a space to showcase designers' work and celebrity interactions. "Joan and Melissa were the first people who came out and made it more of a true conversation between star and reporter", E!'s Senior Vice President of production, Gary Snegaroff, remarked to Vanity Fair. "They asked about what [actresses] were wearing because that's what the magazines would cover after the fact, and turned it into a candid conversation on the carpet where anything could happen". Rivers and Melissa, at the time, both portrayed themselves in the made-for-television drama Tears and Laughter: The Joan and Melissa Rivers Story, which chronicled the aftermath of Rosenburg's suicide. It aired on NBC on May 15, 1994. The next year, she wrote her book Jewelry by Joan Rivers.

Influenced by the stand-up comedy of Lenny Bruce, Rivers co-wrote and starred in a play about Bruce's mother Sally Marr, who was also a comic and influenced her son's development as a comic. After 27 previews, Sally Marr ... and Her Escorts, a play "suggested by the life of Sally Marr" ran on Broadway for 50 performances in May and June 1994. The production received mixed reviews, but her performance was applauded by critics. The Chicago Sun Times found Rivers to be "compelling" as an actress while The New York Times wrote: "... [S]he is exuberant, fearless and inexhaustible. If you admire performers for taking risks, then you can't help but applaud her efforts". Rivers was nominated for a Drama Desk Award as Outstanding Actress in a Play and a Tony Award for Best Actress in a Play for playing Marr. Beginning in 1997, Rivers hosted her own radio show on WOR in New York City, and wrote three self-help books: Bouncing Back: I've Survived Everything ... and I Mean Everything ... and You Can Too! in 1997, From Mother to Daughter: Thoughts and Advice on Life, Love and Marriage in 1998, and Don't Count the Candles: Just Keep the Fire Lit!, in 1999.

2000s 

Rivers was a guest speaker at the opening of the American Operating Room Nurses' San Francisco Conference in 2000, and by the first part of the decade, she continued to host the awards' red carpet for the E! channel. Between 2002 and 2004, she embarked on tour with her one-person comedy show Joan Rivers: Broke and Alone, which was presented in the United Kingdom (Edinburgh and London) and in the United States (Los Angeles, and Boston), to generally positive reviews. The Telegraph felt that her "hilarious assaults on fellow celebrities and tirades about the perils of ageing and plastic surgery are well worth the expense", while The Guardian remarked that "Rivers returned triumphant, a victorious heavyweight after a great fight, conscious that she is still the champion".

In 2003, Rivers left the network red-carpet show for a three-year contract (valued at $6–8 million) to cover award shows' red carpet events for the TV Guide Channel. Meanwhile, Rivers guest-starred as herself in several television series, including Curb Your Enthusiasm, Nip/Tuck, and Boston Legal, and also voiced herself for a brief scene in the 2004 animated fantasy film Shrek 2. In 2004, Rivers was part of the formal receiving party when Ronald Reagan was placed in state at the United States Capitol. On December 3, 2007, Rivers performed at the 79th Royal Variety Show at the Liverpool Empire Theatre, England, with Queen Elizabeth II and Prince Philip present. She wrote and starred in the play Joan Rivers: A Work in Progress by a Life in Progress, which was directed by Sean Foley, and presented through 2008 at the Geffen Playhouse in Los Angeles, the Edinburgh Festival Fringe and the Leicester Square Theatre, to a mixed critical reception.

In 2008, Rivers was invited to take part in a comedy event celebrating Prince Charles' 60th Birthday titled, We Are Most Amused. She was the only American alongside Robin Williams invited to take part in the event. Other comedians included, John Cleese, who served as the master of ceremonies, Eric Idle, Rowan Atkinson, and Bill Bailey. In attendance included Prince Charles, Camilla, Duchess of Cornwall and Prince Harry.

Throughout the decade, Rivers often appeared in various television game shows, including 8 Out of 10 Cats, Big Brother: Celebrity Hijack, and Celebrity Family Feud, in which she competed with her daughter against Ice-T and Coco. In 2009, Rivers and daughter Melissa were contestants on season eight of Celebrity Apprentice. During the season, each celebrity raised money for a charity of his or her choice; Rivers selected God's Love We Deliver. After a falling out with poker player Annie Duke, following Melissa's on-air firing (elimination) by Donald Trump, Rivers left the green room telling Clint Black and Jesse James that she would not be in the next morning. Rivers later returned to the show and on May 3, 2009, she became a finalist in the series. The other finalist was Duke. On the season finale, which aired live on May 10, Rivers was announced the winner and hired to be the 2009 Celebrity Apprentice.

Also in 2009, Rivers was a special "pink-carpet" presenter for the broadcast of the Sydney Gay and Lesbian Mardi Gras parade, was roasted in a Comedy Central special, and her reality show, How'd You Get So Rich?, premiered on TV Land. The program, which ran for two seasons, followed Rivers traveling around the United States interviewing self-made millionaires. She also wrote two books in 2009: Murder at the Academy Awards (R): A Red Carpet Murder Mystery and Men Are Stupid ... And They Like Big Boobs: A Woman's Guide to Beauty Through Plastic Surgery (with Valerie Frankel).

2010s 
A documentary film about Rivers, Joan Rivers: A Piece of Work, premiered at the Sundance Film Festival on January 25, 2010.
The film follows Rivers for 14 months, mostly during the 76th year of her life, and made an effort to "[peel] away the mask" and expose the "struggles, sacrifices and joy of living life as a ground breaking female performer". The film was released in a limited release on June 11, 2010, and was acclaimed by critics for providing "an honest, behind-the-scenes look at [Rivers]' career — and at show business in general". Beginning on September 10, 2010, Rivers co-hosted the E! show Fashion Police, along with Giuliana Rancic, Kelly Osbourne, and George Kotsiopoulos, commenting on celebrity fashion. The show started as a half-hour program but due to its success with viewers, it was expanded to one hour on March 9, 2012. The August 26, 2014 episode of Fashion Police, about the 66th Primetime Emmy Awards and the 2014 MTV Movie Awards, was her last television appearance before her death.

In 2011, Rivers appeared in a commercial for Go Daddy, which debuted during the broadcast of Super Bowl XLV, and was featured as herself in the season two episode of Louis C.K.'s self-titled show Louie entitled "Joan", where she performed on stage and gave C.K. comedy advice. The A.V. Clubs Nathan Rabin described the episode as a "funny and deeply moving exploration of the existential dilemma of the stand-up comic and a valentine to the artform." Also in 2011, Rivers and her daughter starred in the reality show Joan & Melissa: Joan Knows Best?, which premiered on WE tv. The series follows her moving in with her daughter to California to be closer to her family. The show ran for four seasons until 2014. On the December 4, 2011 episode of The Simpsons, "The Ten-Per-Cent Solution", Rivers took on the role of Annie Dubinsky, an agent trying to revive Krusty's career. Hayden Childs of The A.V. Club praised the choice of having Rivers guest star since she was able to "employ her trademark humor within the world of The Simpsons without hijacking the plot or satire". In 2012, she guest-starred in two episodes of two series: Drop Dead Diva and Hot in Cleveland.

Rivers released her 11th book I Hate Everyone...Starting with Me on June 5, 2012. It received generally positive reviews and made The New York Times Best Seller list for several weeks. The New York Times remarked that there were "more punch lines per paragraph than any book I've read in years", and Publishers Weekly felt that "Rivers is equally passionate and opinionated on every subject she discusses. Hilarious and undeniably original". On August 7, 2012, Rivers showed up in Burbank, California to protest that the warehouse club Costco would not sell the book. She handcuffed herself to a shopping cart and shouted through a megaphone. The police were called to the scene and she left without incident; no arrests were made. On March 5, 2013, she launched the online talk show In Bed with Joan on YouTube. In it, Rivers invited a different guest to talk to her in bed about different things including their past, their love life and their career.

Rivers released her 12th book, Diary of a Mad Diva, on July 1, 2014, which also made The NY Times Best Seller list. For the book, she posthumously won the Grammy Award for Best Spoken Word Album in 2015. Before her death, she filmed a part, along with other female comedians, for the documentary MAKERS: Women in Comedy, which premiered on PBS in October 2014.

Comedic style 

During her 55-year career as a comedian, her tough-talking style of satirical humor was both praised and criticized as truthful, yet too personal, too gossipy, and very often abrasive. Nonetheless, with her ability to "tell it like it is", she became a pioneer of contemporary stand-up comedy. Commenting about her style, she told biographer Gerald Nachman, "Maybe I started it. We're a very gossipy culture. All we want to know now is private lives." However, her style of humor, which often relied on making jokes about her own life and satirizing the lives of celebrities and public figures, was sometimes criticized as insensitive. Her jokes about Elizabeth Taylor and Adele's weight, for instance, were often commented on, although Rivers would never apologize for her humor.

Rivers, who was Jewish, was also criticized for making jokes about the Holocaust and later explained, "This is the way I remind people about the Holocaust. I do it through humor", adding, "my husband lost his entire family in the Holocaust." Her joke about the victims of the Ariel Castro kidnappings similarly came under criticism, but she again refused to apologize, stating, "I know what those girls went through. It was a little stupid joke." She received multiple death threats throughout her career. Rivers accepted such criticism as the price of using social satire as a form of humor: "I've learned to have absolutely no regrets about any jokes I've ever done ... You can tune me out, you can click me off, it's OK. I am not going to bow to political correctness. But you do have to learn, if you want to be a satirist, you can't be part of the party."

As an unknown stand-up comedian out of college, she struggled for many years before finding her comic style. She did stints in the Catskills and found that she disliked the older style of comedy at the time, such as Phyllis Diller's, who she nevertheless felt was a pioneer female comedian. Her breakthrough came at The Second City in Chicago in 1961, where she was dubbed "the best girl since Elaine May", who also got her start there. But May became her and fellow comedian Treva Silverman's role model, as Rivers saw her as "an assertive woman with a marvelous, fast mind and, at the same time, pretty and feminine". It was also there that she learned "self reliance", she said, "that I didn't have to talk down in my humor" and could still earn an income by making intelligent people laugh. "I was really born as a comedian at Second City. I owe it my career."

In early 1965, at the suggestion of comedian Bill Cosby, Johnny Carson gave Rivers, whom he billed as a comedy writer, her debut appearance on his show. Cosby, who knew Rivers from their early stand-up days, described her as "an intelligent girl without being a weirdo...a human being, not a kook." Sitting alongside Johnny after her monologue, she displayed an intimate, conversational style which he appreciated, and she was invited back eight more times that year. Time magazine compared her humor to that of Woody Allen, by expressing "how to be neurotic about practically everything", but noting that "her style and femininity make her something special." Rivers also compared herself to Allen, stating: "He was a writer, which I basically was...and talking about things that affected our generation that nobody else talked about." The New York Times critic Charles L. Mee likewise compared her to Allen, explaining that her "style was personal, an autobiographical stream-of-consciousness".

According to biographer Victoria Price, Rivers' humor was notable for taking aim at and overturning what had been considered acceptable female behavior. She broke through long-standing taboos in humor, which paved the way for other women, including Roseanne Barr, Ellen DeGeneres and Rosie O'Donnell.

Rivers became closely associated with her catchphrase: "Can we talk?".

Personal life 
Rivers was one of only four Americans invited to the Wedding of Prince Charles and Camilla Parker Bowles on April 9, 2005.

Rivers was licensed to carry a gun in New York City. She was threatened with the loss of the license after an altercation with a car rental clerk in 2002.

Relationships and family 
Rivers' first marriage was in 1956 to James Sanger, the son of a Bond Clothing Stores merchandise manager. The marriage lasted six months and was annulled on the basis that Sanger did not want children and had not informed Rivers before the wedding.

Rivers married Edgar Rosenberg on July 15, 1965. Their only child, Melissa Rivers, was born on January 20, 1968. Joan Rivers had one grandson, Cooper, born Edgar Cooper Endicott in 2000. Along with his mother and grandmother, Cooper was featured in the WE tv series Joan & Melissa: Joan Knows Best? Rivers was married to Rosenberg until his suicide in 1987, four days after she asked him for a separation. She would later describe her marriage to Rosenberg as a "total sham", complaining bitterly about his treatment of her during their 22-year marriage. In a 2012 interview with Howard Stern, Rivers said she had several extramarital affairs when married to Rosenberg, including a one-night stand with actor Robert Mitchum in the 1960s and an affair with actor Gabriel Dell. In the 1990s, she was in an eight-year relationship with the commissioner of the New York State Office of Parks and Recreation, disabled World War II veteran Orin Lehman of the Lehman family.

In her book Bouncing Back, Rivers described how she developed bulimia nervosa after Rosenberg's 1987 suicide, and the subsequent death of her psychologist, with whom she had developed a close friendship, of an AIDS related illness. Additionally, Rivers' relationship with her daughter had been strained at the time, as Melissa blamed her for her father's death. According to Rivers, the confluence of events resulted in her contemplating suicide in her California home. "I got the gun out, the whole thing," she recalled in a 2008 interview. "And [then] my dog came and sat in my lap...and that was a big turning point in my life. My little, stupid dog, a Yorkie, who I adored, literally came and sat on my lap. ...and literally, he saved my life. Truly saved my life." Rivers eventually recovered with counseling and the support of her family.

In a 2002 ITV biography, Rivers reveals that she is the great niece (on her mother's side) of singer Happy Fanny Fields. She says that, "(Fanny) was the star of the family; she came over to the United States and married very, very rich and became very grand.  But, she was the one person Noël Coward wanted to meet when he hit the United States."

Philanthropy 
As a philanthropist, Rivers supported causes which included HIV/AIDS activism, and in May 1985, she appeared along with Nichols and May at a Comic Relief benefit for the new AIDS Medical Foundation in New York City, where tickets at the Shubert Theatre sold for as much as $500. She supported the Elton John AIDS Foundation and God's Love We Deliver, which delivers meals to HIV/AIDS patients in New York City. In 2008, she was commended by the City of San Diego, California for her philanthropic work on behalf of HIV/AIDS, where the HIV/AIDS community called her its "Joan of Arc".

Additionally, she served as an Honorary Director of the American Foundation for Suicide Prevention. She also supported Guide Dogs for the Blind, a non-profit organization which provides guide dogs to blind people. She donated to Jewish charities, animal welfare efforts, and suicide prevention causes. Among the other non-profit organizations which she helped were Rosie's Theater Kids, Habitat for Humanity, Human Rights Campaign and the Boy Scouts of America.

Cosmetic procedures 
Rivers was open about her multiple cosmetic surgeries and had been a patient of plastic surgeon Steven Hoefflin since 1983. She had her nose thinned while still at college; her next procedure, an eye lift, was performed in 1965 (when she was in her 30s) as an attempt to further her career. When promoting her book, Men Are Stupid...And They Like Big Boobs: A Woman's Guide to Beauty Through Plastic Surgery, described by The New York Times Magazine as "a detailed and mostly serious guide to eye lifts, tummy tucks and other forms of plastic surgery", she quipped: "I've had so much plastic surgery, when I die they will donate my body to Tupperware."

Death 
On August 28, 2014, Rivers experienced serious complications and stopped breathing while undergoing what was scheduled to be a minor throat procedure at an outpatient clinic in Yorkville, Manhattan. Resuscitated an hour later, Rivers was transferred to Mount Sinai Hospital in East Harlem and later put on life support. She died on September 4 at Mount Sinai, never having awakened from a medically induced coma. The New York City Medical Examiner's Office said that she died from brain damage caused by a lack of oxygen.

After nearly two months of investigations, federal officials said on November 10 that the clinic made a number of mistakes both before and during the procedure. Among those were the clinic's failure to respond to Rivers' deteriorating vital signs, including a severe drop in her blood pressure, possibly administering an incorrect anesthetic dosage, performing a surgical procedure without her consent, and other medical-clinic irregularities.

On September 7, after the cremation of Rivers' body at Garden State Crematory in North Bergen, New Jersey, a private memorial service took place at Temple Emanu-El in Manhattan. The service was attended by an estimated 1,500 people. The guest list included Rivers' many celebrity friends and public figures such as Howard Stern, Louis C.K., Whoopi Goldberg, Barbara Walters, Diane Sawyer, Joy Behar, Michael Kors, Matthew Broderick, Sarah Jessica Parker, Rosie O'Donnell, Kathy Griffin, and Donald Trump. The musical performances included Hugh Jackman singing "Quiet Please, There's a Lady On Stage", as well as the New York City Gay Men's Chorus singing old show tunes. Talk show host Howard Stern, who delivered the eulogy, described Rivers as "brassy in public [and] classy in private ... a troublemaker, trail blazer, pioneer for comics everywhere, ... [who] fought the stereotypes that women can't be funny." Daughter Melissa read a comedic note to her mother as part of her eulogy. Some of Rivers' ashes were scattered by her daughter in Wyoming.

On January 26, 2015, Melissa Rivers filed a malpractice lawsuit against the clinic and the doctors who performed surgery on her mother. The suit was settled for an undisclosed amount in May 2016, with the doctors accepting responsibility for Rivers' death.

Reactions and tributes

Upon Rivers' death, friends, fans, family and celebrities paid tribute. Numerous comedians recognized Rivers' influence on their career, including Kathy Griffin, who considered Rivers her "mentor", noting, "She brought a fearlessness and a brand of humor into our homes that we really need." Chris Rock said "she was the hippest comedian from the time she started to the day she died". Describing her as a force in comedy, he added, "No man ever said, 'Yeah, I want to go on after Joan.' No, Joan Rivers closed the show every night." Other comedians recalled working with her on stage and television decades earlier: stand-up performer Don Rickles said "working with her and enjoying the fun times of life with her was special". Carol Burnett calls Rivers "the poster child for the Energizer Bunny".

Numerous talk show hosts, including David Muir, Graham Norton,  Jimmy Fallon, Jimmy Kimmel, Oprah Winfrey, Sally Jessy Raphael, Wendy Williams, Geraldo Rivera, Regis Philbin, Arsenio Hall, Ellen DeGeneres, and David Letterman, paid tribute to Rivers, often including video clips of her appearances. Letterman called her a "real pioneer for other women looking for careers in stand-up comedy. And talk about guts." Conan O'Brien discussed Rivers' legacy with fellow comedian and lifelong friend Chris Hardwick on Conan, while Seth Meyers recalled Rivers' appearance on his talk show, saying, "I have not sat next to anyone who told more jokes faster than Joan Rivers did when she was here." On The Daily Show, host Jon Stewart noted her contributions to comedy: "There are very few people in my business that you can say are, or were, actually groundbreaking talents. Joan Rivers was one of them." Radio host Howard Stern, who delivered the eulogy at her funeral, devoted an entire one-hour show to Rivers. Stern sought help from comedian Louis C.K., another friend of Rivers', before giving the eulogy. When Stern spoke at the funeral, he began the eulogy with, "Joan Rivers had a dry vagina", a joke that was intended, and reportedly received by guests, as a humorous honoring of Rivers' comedic sensibility. Sarah Silverman paid tribute to Rivers while hosting Saturday Night Live; in one sketch, she portrayed Rivers in Heaven. Long-time friend, comedian, fellow talk show hostess and television personality Whoopi Goldberg tweeted: "My friend Joan Rivers has passed away". She said: "Once again to quote Billy Crystal...There are no words." Comedian Louis C.K. released a statement saying, "I looked up to her.  I learned from her. I loved her. I liked her.  And I already miss her very much. It really fucking sucks that she had to die all of a sudden.”
Amy Schumer, speaking at the 2014 Glamour magazine "Woman of the Year Awards" ceremony in Carnegie Hall, paid tribute to Rivers, calling her the bravest female comedian.

Political figures giving tribute to Rivers included former First Lady Nancy Reagan, who said she was one of the "funniest people I ever knew". Upon hearing of her death, Charles, Prince of Wales and his wife Camilla said she was "utterly irreplaceable". Israel's Prime Minister Benjamin Netanyahu noted that besides bringing laughter to millions of people around the world, she was "proud of her Jewish heritage". Then-future U.S. President Donald Trump attended her funeral and tweeted that she "was an amazing woman and a great friend". After her mother's death, Melissa Rivers said she received a letter from President Barack Obama in which he wrote, despite being a frequent target of Rivers' jokes: "not only did she make us laugh, she made us think".

In a subsequent interview with The Huffington Post, Melissa Rivers cited Courtney Love's public tribute to her mother as her favorite, adding: "I loved seeing that outpouring from these women, especially the ones who took the heat on Fashion Police, because it meant they got it. It meant they loved her. It meant they saw the humor."

Influences

Rivers' influences
Joan Rivers was strongly influenced by Lenny Bruce. As a female comic, Rivers felt indebted to, but also very distinct from, other female standups and comedians including Phyllis Diller (a close friend and champion), Fanny Brice, Sophie Tucker, Pearl Williams, Belle Barth, Totie Fields, Jean Carroll, Minnie Pearl, Jackie "Moms" Mabley, Johnny Carson, Zsa Zsa Gabor, Bob Newhart, Woody Allen, Don Rickles, Imogene Coca, Elaine May, Carol Burnett, and Gracie Allen. Rivers's early comedy in particular was influenced by vaudeville, Borscht Belt, and proto-feminist comedy of the early-1900s.

In the 1960s and 1970s, Rivers was in a comedy circuit with Lenny Bruce, Woody Allen, Richard Pryor, George Carlin, and Dick Cavett. Though she counted them as peers and friends, she never felt included due to sexist practices within the industry.

Comedians influenced by Rivers
Mainstream comedians and contemporaries who have claimed that Rivers was an influence on them include: Kathy Griffin, Sarah Silverman, Margaret Cho, Whitney Cummings, Chris Hardwick, Joy Behar, Amy Schumer, Whoopi Goldberg, Chelsea Handler, Louis C.K., Roseanne Barr, Greg Proops and David Letterman. She is considered a pioneer of women in comedy by many critics and journalists.

Work

Filmography

Discography

Bibliography 
  (self-help/humor)
  (humor)
  (autobiography)
  (autobiography)
  (non-fiction)
  (self-help/humor)
  (self-help)
  (self-help)
  (fiction)
  (non-fiction)
  (humor)
  (humor)

 Biography 
  (memoir)
  (biography)
  (photography)

 Audiobooks

All are authored and read by Joan Rivers, except where noted.

Awards and nominations

Other honors 
 On July 26, 1989, she received a star on the Hollywood Walk of Fame, in the 7000 block of Hollywood Boulevard.
 On March 1, 2013, Rivers and her daughter, Melissa Rivers, were honored by the Ride of Fame and a double decker tour bus was dedicated to them in New York City.
 In a Netflix special released in May 2022, The Hall: Honoring the Greats of Stand-Up inducted Joan Rivers into the National Comedy Center in Jamestown, NY.

Citations

General sources

External links 

 
 
 Joan Rivers at the TCM Movie Database
 
 
 

 
1933 births
2014 deaths
20th-century American actresses
20th-century American comedians
20th-century American non-fiction writers
20th-century American women writers
21st-century American actresses
21st-century American comedians
21st-century American essayists
21st-century American women writers
Accidental deaths in New York (state)
Actresses from New York City
American Reform Jews
American comedy writers
American film actresses
American film producers
American health activists
American humorists
American memoirists
American people of Russian-Jewish descent
American satirists
American soap opera actresses
American stand-up comedians
American television actresses
American television talk show hosts
American television writers
American voice actresses
American women comedians
American women film directors
American women film producers
American women memoirists
American women screenwriters
American women television writers
American Zionists
Audiobook narrators
Barnard College alumni
Burials at Forest Lawn Memorial Park (Glendale)
Comedians from New York (state)
Connecticut College alumni
Daytime Emmy Award for Outstanding Talk Show Host winners
Deaths from hypoxia
Edinburgh Comedy Festival
Film directors from New York City
Geffen Records artists
Grammy Award winners
HIV/AIDS activists
Jewish American actresses
Jewish American female comedians
Jewish American philanthropists
Jewish American writers
Jewish American comedy writers
Jewish activists
Jewish women writers
Late night television talk show hosts
Medical malpractice
New York (state) Republicans
Participants in American reality television series
People from Crown Heights, Brooklyn
People from Larchmont, New York
People from Prospect Heights, Brooklyn
Philanthropists from New York (state)
Screenwriters from New York (state)
Stand Up! Records artists
The Apprentice (franchise) winners
Women satirists
Writers from Brooklyn
Stand-up comedy controversies
United Service Organizations entertainers